Enteromius nigeriensis is a species of ray-finned fish in the genus Enteromius which is found from Togo to Sudan.

Footnotes 

 

Enteromius
Fish described in 1903
Taxa named by George Albert Boulenger